Formby railway station is a railway station in the town of Formby, Merseyside, England. The station is located on the Southport branch of the Merseyrail network's Northern Line. The station has a car park.

History

Formby opened in 1848 as an intermediate station on the Liverpool, Crosby and Southport Railway (LCSR). It became part of the Lancashire and Yorkshire Railway (LYR) on 14 June 1855 who took over from the LCSR. The Lancashire and Yorkshire Railway amalgamated with the London and North Western Railway on 1 January 1922 and in turn was Grouped into the London, Midland and Scottish Railway in 1923. Nationalisation followed in 1948 and in 1978 the station became part of the Merseyrail network's Northern Line (operated by British Rail until privatisation in 1995).

Formby is mentioned in the song Slow Train by Flanders and Swann. This is because the Beeching Report listed Formby as a station to be closed, along with the entire Liverpool to Southport route.

Facilities 
The station is staffed, 15 minutes before the first train and 15 minutes after the last train, and has platform CCTV. There is a payphone, ticket machines, booking office and live departure and arrival screens for passenger information. The station has a free car park, with 126 spaces, as well as an 8-space cycle rack and secure indoor storage for 40 cycles. The platforms are fully accessible for wheelchair users with lifts available.

Services
Trains operate every 15 minutes throughout the day from Monday to Saturday and on summer Sundays to Southport to the north, and to Hunts Cross via Liverpool Central to the south. Winter Sunday services are every 30 minutes in each direction.

Gallery

References

Bibliography

External links

Railway stations in the Metropolitan Borough of Sefton
DfT Category E stations
Former Lancashire and Yorkshire Railway stations
Railway stations in Great Britain opened in 1848
Railway stations served by Merseyrail
Formby